The Carlos Palanca Memorial Awards for Literature winners in the year 1975 (rank, title of winning entry, name of author).


English division
Short story
First prize: “Romance and Faith in Mount Banahaw” by Alfred A. Yuson; and “The Day of the Locusts” by Leoncio P. Deriada
Second prize: “Agcalan Point” by Jose Y. Dalisay Jr.; “Once Upon A Cruise: Generations and Other Languages” by Luning B. Ira; and “The Man Who Made a Covenant with the Wind” by Cirilo F. Bautista
Third prize: “A Summer Goodbye” by Benjamin Bautista and Linda Ledesma; “Discovery” by Porfirio Villarin Jr.; “The Dog Eaters” by Leoncio P. Deriada; and “The People's Prison” by Mauro Avena

Poetry
First prize: “Telex Moon” by Cirilo F. Bautista
Second prize: “Adarna: Six Poems from a Larger Corpus” by Wilfredo Pascua Sanchez
Third prize: “The City and the Thread of Life” by Ricaredo Demetillo

One-act play
First prize: “A Life in the Slums” ni Rolando S. Tinio
Second prize: “Password” ni Paul Stephen Lim
Third prize: “The Minerva Foundation” ni Maidan T.

Filipino division
Short story
First prize: “Ang Oktubre ay Buwan ng mga Talahib” by Jose Reyes Munsayac; and "Huwag Mong Tangisan Ang Kamatayan ng Isang Pilipino sa Dibdib ng Niyebe" by Domingo G. Landicho
Second prize: "Guwardiya" by Ave Perez Jacob; and “Wala Nang Lawin sa Bukid ni Tata Felipe” by Benigno R. Juan
Third prize: “Mula Kay Tandang Iskong Basahan” by Jun Cruz Reyes; and “Silang mga Estatwa sa Buhay ni Valentin Dacuycoy” by Alfonso Mendoza

Poetry
Special prizes:
“12 Tula” by Rolando S. Tinio
“Ang Pamumuno ni Abunnawa” by Jose Carreon
“Genesis at Iba pang Tula” by Rosalinda Pineda
“Isang Tungkal na Alabok” by Lualhati Alvero
“Nagbabalik ang Dakilang mga Gabi” by Mar. Al Tiburcio
“Namimintana Ako” by Gloria Villaraza Guzman
“Sino ang Bulag at Iba Pang Tula” by Alberto S. Cruz
“Sunog sa Lipa at Iba Pang Tula” by Bienvenido Lumbera
“Tatlong Tula” by Simon Mercado
“Tsinataklipan: Ugat ng Angkan” by Victor V. Francisco

One-act play
Special prizes:
“Buhay Batilyo” by Manuel Pambid
“Isang Palabas” by Mars D. Cavestany Jr.
“Kulay Rosas na Mura ang Isang Pangarap” by Bienvenido Noriega Jr.
“Luha Para sa Yumao” byi Benjamin P. Pascual
“Sidewalk Vendor” by Reuel Molina Aguila

References
 

Palanca Awards
1975 literary awards